Udea ichinosawana is a moth in the family Crambidae. It was described by Shōnen Matsumura in 1925. It is found in the Russian Far East (Sakhalin).

References

Moths described in 1925
ichinosawana